Lieutenant General Augustus Henry Lane Fox Pitt Rivers  (14 April 18274 May 1900) was an English officer in the British Army, ethnologist, and archaeologist. He was noted for innovations in archaeological methodology, and in the museum display of archaeological and ethnological collections. His international collection of about 22,000 objects was the founding collection of the Pitt Rivers Museum at the University of Oxford while his collection of English archaeology from the area around Stonehenge forms the basis of the collection at The Salisbury Museum in Wiltshire.

Throughout most of his life he used the surname Lane Fox, under which his early archaeological reports are published. In 1880 he adopted the Pitt Rivers name on inheriting from Lord Rivers (a cousin) an estate of more than 32,000 acres in Cranborne Chase.

His family name is often spelled as "Pitt-Rivers". His middle name is sometimes spelled as "Lane-Fox".

Early life and family
Born Augustus Henry Lane-Fox at Bramham cum Oglethorpe near Wetherby in Yorkshire, he was the son of William Lane-Fox and Lady Caroline Douglas, sister of George Douglas, 17th Earl of Morton. The politicians George Lane-Fox and Sackville Lane-Fox were his uncles.

In 1880, Lane Fox inherited the estates of his cousin, Horace Pitt-Rivers, 6th Baron Rivers and with it the remainder of the Richard Rigby fortune. It was "an event that transformed his life." He was required to adopt the surname Pitt-Rivers as part of the bequest 'either alone or in addition to his or their surname'. On 3 February 1853, Pitt-Rivers (still under the surname Fox) married The Honourable Alice Margaret Stanley (1828–1910), daughter of the politician Edward Stanley, 2nd Baron Stanley of Alderley and of the women's education campaigner Henrietta Stanley, Baroness Stanley of Alderley. Alice had a slew of siblings active in the public issues of the day, several of whom married into prominent families. The Pitt Rivers Museum suggests that some of the founding collection, particularly some Indian items, may have come from John Constantine Stanley (1837-1878), younger brother of Alice.

Descendants
Augustus and Alice had nine children who reached adulthood; they were born between 1855 and 1866. As they were all born before Augustus took the new surname in 1880, their births are registered under the name of Fox (or Lane-Fox).

 Alexander Edward Lane Fox-Pitt-Rivers, 2 November 185519 August 1927. 
 St. George Lane Fox-Pitt, 14 September 18566 April 1932, electrical engineer, author, and student of psychic phenomena. 
 William Augustus Lane Fox-Pitt, 9 January 18581945?.
 Ursula Katharine Lane Fox-Pitt, 1859?1942. 
 Lionel Charles Lane Fox-Pitt, 5 November 18601937?.
 Alice Augusta Laurentia Lane Fox-Pitt, circa 186211 March 1947. 
 Agnes Geraldine Fox-Pitt, 25 July 18637 December 1926. 
 Douglas Henry Lane Fox-Pitt, 17 December 186419 September 1922. 
 Arthur Algernon Lane Fox-Pitt, 12 April 18666 November 1895.

Augustus had several notable descendants. One grandson was the anthropologist, eugenicist, and anti-Semite George Pitt-Rivers, who was interned in 1940 under Defence Regulation 18B. George's children included Michael Pitt-Rivers, and his brother, the anthropologist and ethnographer, Julian A. Pitt-Rivers. A further generation includes Augustus's great-great-grandson, William Fox-Pitt, the equestrian.

Military career
Lane Fox had a long and successful military career as a staff officer. He was educated at the Royal Military College, Sandhurst, for six months at the age of fourteen and was commissioned into the Grenadier Guards on 16 May 1845 as an ensign. In the course of a thirty-two-year military career, albeit much interrupted by leave, he only once saw major front line action, at the Battle of Alma in 1854. Soon after the battle, he was found unfit for active service and returned to England. In 1851 he became a member of the committee to experiment and report on the respective merits of the army's smoothbore muskets. He was appointed to Woolwich to instruct in the use of the new Minié rifle in 1852. Subsequently, he was largely responsible for founding the Hythe school of Musketry in Kent and became its principal instructor, revising its Instruction of Musketry manual. The remainder of his service career revolved around musketry instruction and in 1858 he published a paper On the improvement of the rifle as a weapon for general use. He bought a promotion to Captain on 2 August 1850. He was promoted to the brevet rank of lieutenant-colonel of the army "for distinguished Service in the Field" during the Crimean War. On 15 May 1857, he bought the rank of lieutenant-colonel in the Grenadier Guards. The then Brevet-Major Lane Fox, was appointed a member of the Fifth Class of the Order of the Medjidie in 1858 for "distinguished services before the enemy during the [Crimean War]". He was promoted to colonel on 22 January 1867 and major general in 1877. Pitt Rivers retired in 1882 and was accorded the honorary rank of Lt General.

Archaeological career
Pitt Rivers' interests in archaeology and ethnology began in the 1850s, during postings overseas, and he became a noted scientist while he was a serving military officer. His interest began with the evolution of the rifle, which extended to other weapons and tools, and he became a collector of artifacts illustrating the development of human invention. His collection became famous, and, after being exhibited in 1874–1875 at the Bethnal Green Museum, was presented in 1885 to the University of Oxford. He was elected, in the space of five years, to the Ethnological Society of London (1861), the Society of Antiquaries of London (1864) and the Anthropological Society of London (1865). 

In 1867, Pitt Rivers left full-time military service and went on half pay. The same year, he visited an archaeological excavation being carried out in the Yorkshire Wolds by Canon William Greenwell, librarian of Durham Cathedral and an established archaeologist, to whom he may have been introduced by mutual friends George Rolleston or Albert Way. Pitt Rivers received his first instruction in excavation from Greenwell, and later described himself as Greenwell's pupil. Greenwell viewed archaeology as a serious scholarly process of assembling evidence on periods which lacked written records, contrasted to the "ignorant and greedy spirit of mere curiosity-hunting"; views that would influence Pitt Rivers' own approach.

By the time he retired he had amassed ethnographic collections numbering tens of thousands of items from all over the world. Influenced by the evolutionary writings of Charles Darwin and Herbert Spencer, he arranged them typologically and (within types) chronologically. He viewed archaeology as an extension of anthropology and, as consequence, built up matching collections of archaeological and ethnographic objects to show longer developmental sequences to support his views on cultural evolution. This style of arrangement, designed to highlight evolutionary trends in human artefacts, was a revolutionary innovation in museum design.

Pitt Rivers' ethnological collections form the basis of the Pitt Rivers Museum which is still one of Oxford's attractions. His researches and collections cover periods from the Lower Paleolithic to Roman and medieval times, and extend all over the world. The Pitt Rivers Museum curates more than half a million ethnographic and archaeological artifacts, photographic and manuscript collections from all parts of the world. The museum was founded in 1884 when the university accepted the gift of more than 20,000 artifacts from Pitt Rivers, and awarded him the Doctorate of Civil Law in 1886. He was later named a Fellow of the Royal Society. The collections continue to grow, and the museum has been described as one of the "six great ethnological museums of the world".

Pitt Rivers' Wessex Collection is housed in The Salisbury Museum, not far from Stonehenge. The Wessex Gallery of archaeology opened in 2014, funded by the Heritage Lottery Fund and other sources. Pitt Rivers and other early archaeologists such as William Stukeley who first investigated the prehistory of Wiltshire, Cranborne Chase, Avebury and Stonehenge, are celebrated in the gallery.

The estates Pitt Rivers inherited in 1880 contained a wealth of archaeological material from the Roman and Saxon periods. He excavated these over seventeen seasons, from the mid-1880s until his death. His approach was highly methodical by the standards of the time, and he is widely regarded as the first scientific archaeologist to work in Britain. His most important methodological innovation was his insistence that all artefacts, not just beautiful or unique ones, be collected and catalogued. This focus on everyday objects as the key to understanding the past broke decisively with past archaeological practice, which verged on treasure hunting. It is Pitt Rivers' most important, and most lasting, scientific legacy. His work inspired Mortimer Wheeler, among others, to add to the scientific approach of archaeological excavation techniques.

Pitt Rivers created the Larmer Tree Gardens, a public pleasure garden, on the Rushmore estate near Tollard Royal in Wiltshire.

Following the passage of the Ancient Monuments Protection Act 1882, Pitt Rivers became the first Inspector of Ancient Monuments: a post created by anthropologist and parliamentarian John Lubbock who married Pitt Rivers' daughter, Alice. Charged with cataloguing archaeological sites and protecting them from destruction, he worked with his customary methodical zeal but was hampered by the limitations of the law, which gave him little real power over the landowners on whose property the sites stood.

On the advice of Pitt-Rivers, Kit's Coty House and Little Kit's Coty House, Kent, were among the first ancient British remains to be protected by the state. Railings were erected around the stones there to prevent vandalism.

In 1884 he served as High Sheriff of Dorset.

Advocate for cremation

Pitt Rivers was an advocate for cremation. Even though many people believed that it was immoral to destroy a corpse, the cremation movement favored a practical way to dispose of bodies. Pitt Rivers was cremated after his death in 1900.

Bibliography 
Among the publications of August Pitt Rivers are:
 
Excavations on Cranborne Chase (4 volumes)
Excavations on Bokerly and Wansdyke.

Notes

References
 
 Bowden, Mark (1984) General Pitt Rivers: The father of scientific archaeology. Salisbury and South Wiltshire Museum. .
 Bowden, Mark (1991) Pitt Rivers: The life and archaeological work of Lieutenant-General Augustus Henry Lane Fox Pitt Rivers. Cambridge University Press. 
 Bowden, Mark (2000) "Lieutenant-General A.H.L.F. Pitt Rivers", Past – Newsletter of the Prehistoric Society, 34 (April)
 
 
 
Penniman, T.K. General Pitt Rivers Man, Vol. 46, (JulyAugust 1946), pp. 73–74. Published by: Royal Anthropological Institute of Great Britain and Ireland. Article Stable URL: https://www.jstor.org/stable/2793146
 Thompson, M.W. (1977) General Pitt Rivers: Evolution and archaeology in the nineteenth century. Bradford-on-Avon : Moonraker Press.

Further reading

External links

 
 The Pitt Rivers Museum, Oxford, with biography
 The Pitt Rivers Galleries at Salisbury and South Wiltshire Museum
 Augustus Pitt-Rivers on BBC Radio 4's In Our Time, with links and further reading
 
 
 William Tomkin (W.S. Tomkin) Assistant 1882–1890

People associated with the Pitt Rivers Museum
English archaeologists
Fellows of the Royal Society
Fellows of the Ethnological Society of London
Fellows of the Royal Anthropological Institute of Great Britain and Ireland
Presidents of the Royal Anthropological Institute of Great Britain and Ireland
Museum founders
British collectors
1827 births
1900 deaths
People from Wetherby
Graduates of the Royal Military College, Sandhurst
British Army personnel of the Crimean War
Grenadier Guards officers
British Army generals
Fellows of the Society of Antiquaries of London
High Sheriffs of Dorset
19th-century British philanthropists
Historians of weapons